Drakensberg Commando was a light infantry regiment of the South African Army. It formed part of the South African Army Infantry Formation as well as the South African Territorial Reserve.

History

Origins
The Drakensberg Commando was raised in 1961 in Newcastle as a company of the Dundee Commando.

Operations

With the SADF
The unit became a fully fledged unit by August 1964. 

The unit was fell initially under the command of Group 11 until that Group HQ was disbanded and then resorted under command of Group 27 in Eshowe.

A company of this unit did border duty in South West Africa in 1976. 

The units also saw duty in the internal unrest of northern Natal.

With the SANDF

Disbandment
This unit, along with all other Commando units was disbanded after a decision by South African President Thabo Mbeki to disband all Commando Units. The Commando system was phased out between 2003 and 2008 "because of the role it played in the apartheid era", according to the Minister of Safety and Security Charles Nqakula.

Unit Insignia

Leadership

References

See also 
 South African Commando System

Infantry regiments of South Africa
South African Commando Units